The Día de la Canción Criolla is a Peruvian festivity celebrated yearly on October 31st. The event celebrates the criollo culture of Peru. It was established on October 18th 1944 by the President Manuel Prado y Ugarteche.

References 

El Comercio
Radio Programas el Peru

Festivals in Peru